"Rest of My Life" is a song by the San Diego-based rock band Unwritten Law. It originally appeared on their 2001 album Elva, but this version was not released as a single and did not chart. An alternate recording from their 2003 live acoustic album Music in High Places did chart, reaching #16 on Billboard's Modern Rock Tracks chart.

Personnel

Band
Scott Russo - lead vocals
Steve Morris - lead guitar, backing vocals
Rob Brewer - rhythm guitar, backing vocals
Pat "PK" Kim - bass guitar
Wade Youman - drums

Production
Don Worsham and Wil Burston – recording engineers
John Alagia and Jeff Juliano – mixing
Peter Harding – additional engineering and editing
Baraka – Pro Tools

References

2003 songs
Unwritten Law songs
Song recordings produced by Josh Abraham